Cavagnolo is a comune (municipality) in the Metropolitan City of Turin in the Italian region Piedmont, about  northeast of Turin.

Cavagnolo borders the following municipalities: Brusasco, Monteu da Po, Lauriano, Moransengo, and Tonengo.

Geography 
The comune of Cavagnolo is situated in the northern Montferrat; its territory is mostly hilly.

Main sights
The abbey of Santa Fede was founded by the Benedictine monks of Sainte-Foy-de-Conque (Alvernia-France) toward halves the 12th century.  Besides the ruins of the castle, other sights include the Church of St. Secondo to the Cemetery, old parish church, the town hall and Villa Martini, residence on the hills of Cavagnolo.

References

Cities and towns in Piedmont